Hematitida is a group of coleoid cephalopods known from the early Carboniferous Period.  They are the oldest definite coleoids, although there are controversial claims for even older coleoids from the Devonian. Fossil hematitidans have so far been found only in Arkansas and Utah of the United States.  The only family described so far is Hematitidae.

Characteristics
Some features shared by hematitidans include
 a short rostrum, made of aragonite and organic material, and bearing ridges
 a short living chamber, only 1.5 to 2 times the length of the last chamber of the phragmocone
 a spherical protoconch
 a narrow, straight phragmocone
 a multi-layered conotheca - the outer wall of the phragmocone
 a narrow, ventral siphuncle

Classification
The classification for this group comes from Doguzhaeva et al. 2003

Order Hematitida Doguzhaeva, Mapes, & Mutvei, 2002
 Family Hematitidae Gustomesov 1976
 Hematites Flower & Gordon 1959 - type genus
 Bactritimimus Flower & Gordon, 1959
 Paleoconus Flower & Gordon, 1959

References

Cephalopod orders
Belemnoidea